Kimmo Samuel Timonen (born 18 March 1975) is a Finnish former professional ice hockey defenseman who played 16 seasons in the National Hockey League (NHL) for the Nashville Predators, Philadelphia Flyers, and Chicago Blackhawks. Timonen had played in over 1,100 NHL games before retiring. During his career, Timonen had also featured in three IIHF World Junior Championships, seven IIHF World Championships, two World Cups and five Olympic tournaments. He won the Stanley Cup with the Chicago Blackhawks in 2015 in his final career game.

He was inducted into the IIHF Hall of Fame in 2020.

Playing career
Timonen was the youngest player to play for Finland at the 1993 IIHF World Junior Championships at the age of 17. He recorded the second-highest shot total in the tournament with 44.

Timonen was drafted by the Los Angeles Kings in the tenth round, 250th overall, of the 1993 NHL Entry Draft. After the draft, he continued to play in his native Finland for several years, first for KalPa and then later for TPS. In 1998, Timonen played on the bronze medal-winning Finnish Olympic team in Nagano. Shortly after the Olympics, the Kings traded him, along with Jan Vopat, to the Nashville Predators organization (the team not yet having begun play) in agreement that Nashville would not select Garry Galley in the 1998 NHL Expansion Draft.

With the Nashville Predators 
During the 1998–99 season, Timonen split time between Nashville and their IHL affiliate, the Milwaukee Admirals. The following year, he was promoted to a full-time NHL player. He played the next four seasons for the Predators, steadily improving his offensive output, until the 2004–05 NHL lockout. During the lockout, Timonen played for his hometown team, KalPa, which he partly owns with former Flyers teammate Sami Kapanen. Timonen also persuaded his teammate Adam Hall to play for KalPa for the duration of the lockout.

Timonen represented Finland at the 2004 World Cup of Hockey and led his team in scoring with six points, the fifth-highest total overall in the tournament.

On 3 October 2006, Timonen was named the captain of the Nashville Predators for the 2006–07 season. That season proved to be a career year for Timonen, as he registered career highs in both assists and total points.

With the Philadelphia Flyers 
Following the 2006–07 season, Timonen was traded to the Philadelphia Flyers. Shortly after, he signed a six-year, $37.8 million contract extension with them, a deal which made him the highest paid Finn in the NHL. At the time, Timonen's younger brother Jussi Timonen was playing for the Philadelphia Phantoms, the Flyers' American Hockey League (AHL) affiliate. However, Jussi was subsequently traded to the Dallas Stars early in the 2007–08 season.

The Flyers beat the Washington Capitals 4–3 and the Montreal Canadiens 4–1 in the first two rounds of the 2008 Stanley Cup playoffs. During Game 4 of the Flyers' series with Montreal, Timonen was hit by a wrist shot on his foot by Canadiens defenseman Andrei Markov. Timonen felt numbness in his foot as the week progressed, though believed it to be nothing but a twisted nerve. After an MRI failed to reveal any injury, Timonen had the foot examined at the Hospital of the University of Pennsylvania, where, on 8 May, the doctor found a small blood clot in his foot. He was sidelined indefinitely and missed the first four games of the Eastern Conference Finals against the Pittsburgh Penguins. Timonen returned for Game 5, but the Flyers eventually lost the game and their playoff run came to an end.

In the 2009–10 regular season, Timonen led all NHL defensemen in shorthanded goals scored, with two. That year, Timonen would play in his first ever Stanley Cup Final, though the Flyers would lose to the Chicago Blackhawks in a six-game series.

Timonen scored his 100th career goal on 5 March 2011, against the Buffalo Sabres. He ended the season in a tie with Marc Staal for most shorthanded goals among defensemen, with two.

Timonen recorded his 500th career point with an assist on 1 March 2012, against the New York Islanders. He played his 1,000th NHL game on 18 March 2013, his 37th birthday.

Blood clots and Stanley Cup victory with the Chicago Blackhawks 
In preparation for the 2014–15 season, on 5 August 2014, Timonen was diagnosed with blood clots in both of his lungs as well as in his right leg. The serious nature of injury ruled Timonen out indefinitely with the Flyers. Approaching the NHL trade deadline, and returning to health after missing the first 62 games of the season, Timonen was traded by the Flyers to the Chicago Blackhawks in exchange for a 2015 second-round pick and 2016 conditional fourth-round pick on 27 February 2015. He left the Flyers organization as the third most productive defenseman in franchise history, with 270 points in 519 games. On 21 March 2015, he played in his 1,100th NHL game.

On 5 March, Timonen announced his intent to retire from professional hockey after the 2014–15 season. On 15 June, Timonen won his first Stanley Cup with the Blackhawks in the final game of his 20-year career. During the celebration, Timonen was the first player to receive the Stanley Cup following captain Jonathan Toews. Timonen reflected on his career stating, "I was dreaming about this moment for a long time, and it’s right here. This game has given me so much, and I’m relieved, happy, ready to leave this game, and I’m leaving this game as a Stanley Cup champion." He was the last active player in the NHL from the 1993 NHL entry draft.

In February 2016, President Barack Obama received the winning Blackhawks team in the White House. During his speech, he unexpectedly gave Timonen a laudation:

Timonen commented on this to the Finnish state broadcasting company YLE:

Personal life
Kimmo is married to Johanna Timonen and has 3 children.
Kimmo announced his retirement after winning the Stanley Cup in 2015 with the Blackhawks.
Timonen owns several restaurants and nightclubs in his hometown of Kuopio.

Career statistics

Regular season and playoffs

International

Awards
1994 - First Team All-Star selection at the World Junior Ice Hockey Championships
1997 - Matti Keinonen trophy for best +/- in the SM-liiga
Two-time Kanada-malja champion - 1995, 1998 (TPS and HIFK)
2005 - Elected most valuable player in the Mestis playoffs
2005 - Mestis champion (KalPa)
Named to NHL All-Star Game: 2000 (unable to play due to injury), 2004, 2007, 2008, 2012
Five-time Barry Ashbee Trophy winner as Philadelphia Flyers best defenseman – 2008, 2009, 2012, 2013, 2014
2015 - Stanley Cup champion (Chicago Blackhawks)
KalPa #44 jersey retired 2016
2020 IIHF Hall of Fame inductee. The induction ceremony was scheduled during the 2020 IIHF World Championship, but was delayed due to the COVID-19 pandemic. The IIHF Hall of Fame class of 2020/2022 was inducted during the 2022 IIHF World Championship.

See also
List of NHL players with 1,000 games played

References

External links

 
 The President Welcomes the Chicago Blackhawks, 2015 Stanley Cup Champions — Barack Obaman makes a special mention of Timonen at the White House at 4:14, YouTube.

1975 births
Brynäs IF players
Chicago Blackhawks players
Finnish ice hockey defencemen
HC Lugano players
HIFK (ice hockey) players
Ice hockey players at the 1998 Winter Olympics
Ice hockey players at the 2002 Winter Olympics
Ice hockey players at the 2006 Winter Olympics
Ice hockey players at the 2010 Winter Olympics
Ice hockey players at the 2014 Winter Olympics
KalPa players
Living people
Los Angeles Kings draft picks
Milwaukee Admirals (IHL) players
Nashville Predators players
National Hockey League All-Stars
Olympic bronze medalists for Finland
Olympic ice hockey players of Finland
Olympic silver medalists for Finland
People from Kuopio
Philadelphia Flyers players
HC TPS players
Olympic medalists in ice hockey
Medalists at the 2014 Winter Olympics
Medalists at the 2010 Winter Olympics
Medalists at the 2006 Winter Olympics
Medalists at the 1998 Winter Olympics
Stanley Cup champions
Sportspeople from North Savo
Finnish expatriate ice hockey players in the United States
Finnish expatriate ice hockey players in Switzerland
Finnish expatriate ice hockey players in Sweden